The 2006–07 KFC Cup was the 33rd edition of the Regional Super50, the domestic limited-overs cricket competition for the countries of the West Indies Cricket Board (WICB). The competition was played between 9 January and 17 February 2007, using a round-robin format followed by play-offs.

The six teams participating in the competition were Barbados, Guyana, Jamaica, the Leeward Islands, Trinidad and Tobago, and the Windward Islands. Trinidad and Tobago were undefeated in the round-robin, and eventually defeated the Windward Islands in the final to win their eighth domestic one-day title. The semi-finals and final were all held in Saint Vincent and the Grenadines, at Kingstown's Arnos Vale Stadium. Trinidad and Tobago's Kieron Pollard led the tournament in runs, while Jamaican fast bowler Jermaine Lawson took the most wickets.

Squads

Round-robin stage

Finals

Semi-finals

Final

Statistics

Most runs
The top five run scorers (total runs) are included in this table.

Source: CricketArchive

Most wickets

The top five wicket takers are listed in this table, listed by wickets taken and then by bowling average.

Source: CricketArchive

References

2007 in West Indian cricket
Regional Super50 seasons
Domestic cricket competitions in 2006–07